Byley is a civil parish in Cheshire West and Chester, England.  It contains three buildings that are recorded in the National Heritage List for England as designated listed buildings, all of which are at Grade II.  This grade is the lowest of the three gradings given to listed buildings and is applied to "buildings of national importance and special interest".  Apart from the small village of Byley, the parish is entirely rural.  The listed buildings consist of the village church, and two houses.

See also
Listed buildings in Allostock
Listed buildings in Bostock
Listed buildings in Cranage
Listed buildings in Davenham
Listed buildings in Lach Dennis
Listed buildings in Sproston
Listed buildings in Stanthorne
Listed buildings in Wimboldsley

References
Citations

Sources

Listed buildings in Cheshire West and Chester
Lists of listed buildings in Cheshire